Henry T. Croft (August 1, 1875 – December 11, 1933) was a professional baseball player from 1899 to 1901, playing for three Major League teams: the Chicago Orphans, the Philadelphia Phillies, and the Louisville Colonels.

Biography
Harry Croft was born in Chicago, Illinois on August 1, 1875.  He attended Niagara University and played baseball for the university.  He was drafted by the Louisville Colonels in the 1898 rule 5 draft.

Croft had his professional baseball debut at age 23 on May 19, 1899 with the Louisville Colonels.  He played two games as an outfielder with the Colonels before being released in July 1899. He was signed by the Philadelphia Phillies on July 26, 1899 as a free agent, and played second base in 2 games for the Phillies in the 1899 season. He played for the Chicago Orphans in his second and last season (1901), playing in three (3) games in the outfield during the season, with his final game on September 24, 1901.

Croft died on December 11, 1933 in Oak Park, Illinois.   He is buried in Mount Carmel Cemetery in Hillside, Illinois.

Notes

References

1875 births
1933 deaths
Chicago Orphans players
Louisville Colonels players
Philadelphia Phillies players
Major League Baseball outfielders
Niagara Purple Eagles baseball players
Batavia Giants players
Geneva Alhambras players
Auburn Maroons players
Johnstown Mormans players
Palmyra Mormans players
Syracuse Stars (minor league baseball) players
Binghamton Crickets (1880s) players
Binghamton Bingoes players
Peoria Distillers players
Toledo Mud Hens players
Baseball players from Chicago